Early general elections were held in Paraguay on 1 May 1989 to elect the president and Chamber of Deputies. They were the first held since longtime president Alfredo Stroessner was toppled in a military coup on 3 February, seven months after being sworn in for an eighth term. For the first time in several years, the opposition was allowed to contest the elections more or less unmolested; the Communists were the only party that was banned from taking part.

Andrés Rodríguez, who had led the coup and had been serving as provisional president since then, was elected president in his own right running on the Colorado Party ticket. The Colorado Party also won 48 of the 72 seats in the Chamber of Deputies. Voter turnout was 52%.

The legislative elections were called after Rodríguez dissolved the previous Congress in February, citing a provision of the constitution that allowed the president to do so if they felt Congress had acted in a manner that distorted the separation of powers. Rodríguez used the new elections as a tool to purge pro-Stroessner "militants" from the Colorado caucus. The presidential elections were held because the constitution required new elections if a president died, resigned, or was permanently disabled less than two years into their term. That same provision stipulated that the winner would not serve a full five-year term, but only the remainder of the previous president's term. In this case, Rodríguez won the right to serve the remainder of Stroessner's term, which was due to end in 1993.

Results

President

Chamber of Deputies

References

Paraguay
1989 in Paraguay
Elections in Paraguay
Presidential elections in Paraguay
May 1989 events in South America